Klisa is an urban area of the city of Novi Sad, Serbia.

Name
Its name derived from Latin word "ecclesia", meaning "church place". During Ottoman rule, the Serb population used word "klisa" to designate places where ruins of the church buildings were located.

Location

Klisa is located in the northern part of Novi Sad, between Klisanski breg and Industrijska Zona Sever in the west, Industrijska Zona Jug in the south, Vidovdansko Naselje, Slana Bara and Veliki Rit in the east, and Rimski Šančevi and Deponija in the north.

Parts of the neighborhood
Klisa is divided into two parts: Gornja Klisa ("upper Klisa") and Donja Klisa ("lower Klisa"). The nearby neighborhood of Slana Bara is sometimes also seen as a third part of Klisa.

History
In the territory of present-day Gornja Klisa, there was an ancient human settlement dating from 1000 BC. This is the oldest known human settlement in the present-day territory of Novi Sad.

In the medieval period (13th-16th century), a settlements named Gornje Sajlovo (Zajol) and Vašaroš Varad (Vásárosvárad) existed at this location.

Gallery

Features
The district prison is located in the northern part of Klisa.

See also
Neighborhoods of Novi Sad

References

Jovan Mirosavljević, Brevijar ulica Novog Sada 1745-2001, Novi Sad, 2002.
Milorad Grujić, Vodič kroz Novi Sad i okolinu, Novi Sad, 2004.

External links
Klisa za radikale, centar za DS i koaliciju oko LDP (in Serbian)
Map of Novi Sad

Novi Sad neighborhoods